Diporiphora australis, the Tommy roundhead or eastern two-line dragon, is a species of agama found in Australia and Papua New Guinea.

References

Diporiphora
Agamid lizards of Australia
Taxa named by Franz Steindachner
Reptiles described in 1867